Judith Vandermeiren (born 10 August 1994) is a Belgian field hockey player. At the 2012 Summer Olympics she competed with the Belgium women's national field hockey team in the women's tournament.

References

External links 
 

Living people
1994 births
Field hockey players at the 2012 Summer Olympics
Olympic field hockey players of Belgium
Belgian female field hockey players
Sportspeople from Antwerp
Female field hockey defenders
Female field hockey midfielders